Harvard Harry Lien (April 5, 1896 in Norway – Sept 19, 1978 in Park Ridge, Illinois) was an American ski jumper and a member of the US National Ski Hall of Fame who competed in the 1924 Winter Olympics in Chamonix, France.

He learned to ski and jump in his native Norway, moved to the United States when he was 20. He joined the U.S Army in 1917, serving for twenty months and was discharged in 1919.   His skiing career went from 1919 to 1933 although he did participate in the 1937 Norge Annual Meet as a last hurrah, placing second. 

In 1969, he was elected to the US Ski Association's Hall of Fame in Ishpeming, Michigan.

References

1901 births
1978 deaths
American male ski jumpers
Norwegian emigrants to the United States
People from Park Ridge, Illinois
Ski jumpers at the 1924 Winter Olympics
Olympic ski jumpers of the United States